The 1920 United States presidential election in Tennessee took place on November 2, 1920, as part of the 1920 United States presidential election. Tennessee voters chose 12 representatives, or electors, to the Electoral College, who voted for president and vice president.

Background
For over a century after the Civil War, Tennessee was divided according to political loyalties established in that war. Unionist regions covering almost all of East Tennessee, Kentucky Pennyroyal-allied Macon County, and the five West Tennessee Highland Rim counties of Carroll, Henderson, McNairy, Hardin and Wayne voted Republican – generally by landslide margins – as they saw the Democratic Party as the “war party” who had forced them into a war they did not wish to fight. Contrariwise, the rest of Middle and West Tennessee who had supported and driven the state’s secession was equally fiercely Democratic as it associated the Republicans with Reconstruction. After the disfranchisement of the state’s African-American population by a poll tax was largely complete in the 1890s, the Democratic Party was certain of winning statewide elections if united, although unlike the Deep South Republicans would almost always gain thirty to forty percent of the statewide vote from mountain and Highland Rim support. When the Democratic Party was bitterly divided, the Republicans did win the governorship in 1910 and 1912, but did not gain at other levels.

During the period before the 1920 presidential election, Tennessee was the center of bitter debate over the ratification of the Nineteenth Amendment, which the state – with its Democratic Party still seriously divided – ultimately passed by a very close margin, 50 to 46, in the House of Representatives.

Although most of the Republicans in the state legislature had supported the Nineteenth Amendment, outgoing Democratic President Woodrow Wilson’s League of Nations was deeply unpopular in the isolationist and fundamentalist Appalachian regions, and the President was thus stigmatized for his advocacy of that organization. Democratic nominee James M. Cox also supported American participation in the League, whereas his rival Warren Harding was largely opposed to the League and was helped in the South by racial and labor unrest elsewhere in the country.

Vote
At the end of October, opinions were divided on whether Harding could break the “Solid South” in Tennessee – which had had the strongest Republican Party in the region ever since Reconstruction was overthrown – with some suggesting he could make a challenge in North Carolina  whose poll tax was being abolished at this time. Claims continued to be divisive until even after the polls in the Volunteer State had closed.

Ultimately a late swing to Harding ensured the “Solid South” was broken for the first time since 1876, and Harding became only the second Republican to carry Tennessee after Ulysses S. Grant in 1868. Harding’s victory did not see a major change in partisan alignments, but was due to gains in normally Democratic rural white counties of Middle Tennessee – where he was the only Republican to carry Perry County until John McCain in 2008 and the solitary GOP victor in Jackson County until Mitt Romney in 2012 – plus abnormally high voter turnout amongst isolationist mountaineers in rock-ribbed Republican East Tennessee. Harding also gained important help through overwhelming support from the few blacks able to vote – all residing within the state’s largest cities – due to his public support for civil rights for African-Americans.

Results

Results by county

Notes

References 

1920 Tennessee elections
Tennessee
1920